Kris Fair (born August 19, 1984) is an American politician who is a member for the Maryland House of Delegates in District 3 in Frederick County, Maryland.

Background
Fair grew up in Mount Airy, Maryland, and graduated from Linganore High School in 2002. He later attended Frederick Community College, where he received an Bachelor's degree in general studies in 2008; and Hood College, where he earned a Bachelor of Arts degree in political science and history in 2013. Fair was the manager of New York, New York Salon in Frederick for 17 years until he left in 2021. Fair was also the chair of the Student Homelessness Initiative Partnership from 2017 to 2021.

Fair first got involved with politics in 2012, serving as a Frederick County campaign coordinator for Question 6. He later served as the vice-chair of the Frederick County Democratic Central Committee, and as the Frederick County Democratic Party campaign manager in 2014. In January 2017, Fair announced that he would run for the Frederick City Board of Aldermen. His candidacy was backed by county executive Jan Gardner, state senator Ron Young, and various county council members and city aldermen. His platform included improving the city's infrastructure, providing equitable services, and supporting a responsive government. He came in sixth place in the nonpartisan primary, receiving 10.2 percent of the vote.

In May 2018, Fair launched the Maryland LGBT PAC, a political action committee that seeks to support openly-LGBT candidates. He currently serves as the executive director of The Frederick Center, a local advocacy group for LGBTQ individuals.

During the 2021 legislative session, Fair worked as a legislative director for state delegate Karen Lewis Young. He stepped down from the position in January 2022 to run for the Maryland House of Delegates, seeking to succeed Young. During the primary, he was endorsed by Young and her husband, Ron Young, the Maryland State Teachers Association, and half a dozen local elected officials. Kris won the Democratic primary, coming in second place behind incumbent state Delegate Ken Kerr with 19.7 percent of the vote.

In the legislature
Fair was sworn into the Maryland House of Delegates on January 11, 2023. He is a member of the House Ways and Means Committee.

Political positions

Climate change
During his House of Delegates campaign, Fair called climate change the "[number one] threat to our humanity". He ran on a platform that included advancing the Climate Solutions Now Act, an omnibus bill passed by the Maryland General Assembly during the 2022 legislative session that would reduce greenhouse gas emissions by 60 percent by 2030, while also advocating for the state to provide agricultural workers with resources to implement regenerative farming techniques and increase biodiversity in their fields.

Education
Fair supports the Blueprint for Maryland's Future, a sweeping education reform bill passed in 2021, and says he would work to ensure that the funding provided through the Blueprint is spent as legislators intended.

Social issues
Fair supported a bill introduced by Delegate Karen Lewis Young during the 2020 legislative session that would prohibit hospitals and related institutions from discriminating against admitting or providing care to people on the basis of "sex, sexual orientation, gender identity, religion or creed, citizenship, age, physical or mental disability, [or] genetic information".

Transportation
Fair does not support proposals to widen Interstate 270 and the Capital Beltway, instead supporting efforts to make the state's mass transportation options, such as MARC Trains, more accessible in the state. He also supports expanding the Red Line to Urbana.

Personal life
Fair is openly gay and married to his husband Dominick Fair as of August 2013.

Electoral history

References

External links
 

21st-century American politicians
1984 births
Democratic Party members of the Maryland House of Delegates
Gay politicians
LGBT people from Maryland
LGBT state legislators in Maryland
Living people
People from Mount Airy, Maryland

Year of birth uncertain